Craig Stewart, born 15 September 1956, is a former professional Australian rules footballer who played for the Collingwood Football Club and Richmond Football Club in the Victorian Football League (VFL). He is the father of James Stewart who plays for the Essendon Football Club.

Stewart started out in the VFA with Preston, topping their goal kicking in 1976 and winning their 'best and fairest' award in 1977. He joined Collingwood in 1978 and went on to play 115 games for the club, including the 1980 and 1981 grand finals, which they lost. When not playing in the ruck he was used up forward and kicked 32 goals in 1979.

References

Holmesby, Russell and Main, Jim (2007). The Encyclopedia of AFL Footballers. 7th ed. Melbourne: Bas Publishing.

External links

1956 births
Living people
Australian rules footballers from Victoria (Australia)
Collingwood Football Club players
Richmond Football Club players
Preston Football Club (VFA) players